Alain J. Maury (born 1958) is a French astronomer who has discovered numerous asteroids.

He discovered the periodic comet 115P/Maury as well as the non-periodic C/1988 C1 (Maury-Phinney).

He has discovered a number of asteroids, including the Apollo asteroid 3838 Epona and the Amor asteroids 11284 Belenus and 5370 Taranis.

He participated in the OCA DLR Asteroid Survey (ODAS), which also discovered more than 2200 asteroids during its 30-month lifetime.

The asteroid 3780 Maury was named in his honour.

Since 2003, Maury and his wife Alejandra have operated their own observatory near San Pedro de Atacama in Northern Chile. There, they give tours introducing visitors to the night sky in order to finance their own research and further public interest in astronomy.

References

External links 
 Homepage
 Personal Webpage (French)

20th-century French astronomers
Discoverers of asteroids

Living people
1958 births
21st-century French astronomers